Lisa Davies is an American former model.

Lisa Davies may also refer to:

Lisa Davies (basketball), Women's Basketball Academic All-America of the Year
Lisa Davies (curler), on 2012-13 Ontario Curling Tour
Lisa Davies (presenter), on One News (New Zealand)
Lisa Davies, character in The Tomorrow People

See also
Lisa Davis (disambiguation)